EDL may refer to:

Politics 
 English Defence League, an English far-right organization
 European Defence League, an offshoot organization of the English Defence League
 English Disco Lovers, an internet movement to lower the search ranking of EDL as the English Defence League
 Estonian Defence League, an Estonian voluntary militarily organized national defence organisation 
 European Democratic Lawyers, a labour union
European Day of Languages, an annual event aimed at encouraging language learning in Europe

Technology 
 Entry, descent and landing (rocketry) 
 Edit decision list
 Electrical double layer
 Event Driven Language, a computer language for the IBM Series/1 Event Driven Executive operating system
 Experiment Description Language, a computer language for the program Fsc2 for controlling spectrometers
 Qualcomm EDL mode, a debugging feature in SoCs from Qualcomm

Transport 
 Edale railway station, in England
 Eldoret International Airport, in Kenya

Medicine 
 Essential Drugs List, also known as a list of essential medicines

Other uses 
 Electricité Du Liban, a Lebanese electrical utility
 Electricité du Laos, the state electrical utility of Laos
 Electronic Defense Laboratories, a defunct American defense company
 Enhanced Drivers License, in North America
 Every Day Life, an American rapcore group